The 402nd Maintenance Wing, sometimes written as 402d Maintenance Wing, (402 MXW) is an inactive wing of the United States Air Force last based at Robins Air Force Base, Georgia. As a maintenance wing it provided depot maintenance, engineering support, and software development to major weapon systems (F-15 Eagle, C-5 Galaxy, C-130 Hercules, C-17 Globemaster III and Special Operations Forces aircraft).

From 1943 to 1945, RAF Station Warton, 6.9 miles west of Preston, Lancashire, where the 402d Air Depot, later the 402d Base Air Depot, was located, operated as a United States Army Air Forces depot and staging point. Thousands of aircraft were processed at Warton on their way to active service in Great Britain, North Africa, the Mediterranean Theater of Operations, and mainland Europe.

Lineage
 Constituted as the 402d Air Depot on 30 March 1943
 Activated on 15 April 1943
 Redesignated 402d Base Air Depot on 17 July 1944
 Inactivated on 24 November 1945
 Disbanded on 8 October 1948
 Reconstituted and redesignated 402d Maintenance Wing on 31 January 2005
 Activated on 4 March 2005
 Inactivated on 1 October 2012

Assignments
 Eighth Air Force (later United States Strategic Air Forces, United States Air Forces Europe), 15 April 1943 - 24 November 1945
 Warner Robins Air Logistics Center (later Warner Robins Air Logistics Complex), 4 March 2005 (attached to Air Force Sustainment Center after 17 July 2012)
 Air Force Sustainment Center, 1 October 2012 – present (inactivated 1 October 2012)

Components
 402d Aircraft Maintenance Group, 4 March 2005 - 1 October 2012 (attached to Warner Robins Air Logistics Complex after 17 July 2012)
 402d Commodities Maintenance Group, 4 March 2005 - 1 October 2012 (attached to Warner Robins Air Logistics Complex after 17 July 2012)
 402d Electronics Maintenance Group, 4 March 2005 - 1 October 2012 (attached to Warner Robins Air Logistics Complex after 17 July 2012)
 402d Maintenance Support Group, 4 March 2005 - 1 October 2012 (attached to Warner Robins Air Logistics Complex after 17 July 2012)
 402d Software Maintenance Group, 4 March 2005 - 1 October 2012 (attached to Warner Robins Air Logistics Complex after 17 July 2012)

Stations
 RAF Warton (Station 582), Lancashire, 15 April 1943 - 24 November 1945
 Robins Air Force Base, Georgia, 4 March 2005 - 1 October 2012

References

Notes

Bibliography

External links
Robins AFB Home Page

0402
Military units and formations established in 2005
Military units and formations in Georgia (U.S. state)